The Otter Tail Valley Railroad  is a Class III railroad operating  of track between Moorhead, Minnesota, and Fergus Falls, Minnesota, and short branch lines from Fergus Falls to French and from Fergus Falls to Hoot Lake.

The railroad began operations in 1986 on former Burlington Northern, ex Great Northern Railway track between Moorhead and Avon, Minnesota, interchanging with Burlington Northern.

In 2008, the railroad handled approximately 10,000 carloads, principally outbound grain and inbound coal.

Otter Tail Valley Railroad is owned by Genesee & Wyoming, having been acquired in 1996.

References

 
 

Minnesota railroads
RailAmerica
Spin-offs of the Burlington Northern Railroad
Fergus Falls, Minnesota
Genesee & Wyoming